Philip, Duke of Mecklenburg, sometimes called Philip I (12 September 1514 – 4 January 1557) was a Duke of Mecklenburg-Schwerin.

He was the youngest son of Henry V, Duke of Mecklenburg, and Helen of the Palatinate, a daughter of Philip, Elector Palatine.  As a result of an injury at a tournament he was mentally ill for many years.  After Henry V's death in 1552, he lived at the court of Duke Ulrich of Mecklenburg in Güstrow, where he died.  Whether he ruled actively is questionable in the light of his disability.

He was buried in the Doberan Minster.

External links 

 Genealogical table of the House of Mecklenburg

Dukes of Mecklenburg-Schwerin
House of Mecklenburg
1514 births
1557 deaths
16th-century German people